André Vignolles was a French Contemporary artist active around France from the mid 20th century.

References

1920 births
2017 deaths
20th-century French painters
21st-century French painters